In the 1998–99 season, Newcastle United competed in the FA Premier League (known as the FA Carling Premiership for sponsorship reasons). Newcastle's season was an almost carbon copy of the one before. They finished 13th in the Premiership and lost in the FA Cup final to enter Europe because the winning side had already qualified for the Champions League.

Just after the season started, Kenny Dalglish paid for Newcastle's sub-standard league performances with his job. The task was given to Ruud Gullit to turn things round, but he could not improve on the club's previous league finish of 13th. A dismal league position put them below local rivals Middlesbrough as well as other unfancied sides including Derby County and Sheffield Wednesday.

Season summary

A poor start to the 1998–99 season led to Kenny Dalglish being sacked. Ruud Gullit, a trophy winning manager with Chelsea a few years previously, was put in charge. The team again started promisingly, but was knocked out of the Cup Winners' Cup in the first round.

Gullit made some high-profile mistakes in the transfer market (notably, Spanish defender Marcelino and forward Silvio Maric bore the brunt of supporters frustrations). Less forgivably, he also fell out with several senior players, including the club captain Rob Lee, who had been the heartbeat of the team for the previous half decade, and was initially not given a squad number.

Newcastle made it to the 1998–99 FA Cup final, their second final in successive seasons. This time around they were to lose to Manchester United 2–0.

Because the FA Cup winners had already won European qualification, this meant Newcastle reached Europe for the fourth season running: this time the 1999–2000 UEFA Cup, due to the discontinuation of the Cup Winners' Cup.

Gullit resigned shortly after the start of the 1999–2000 season.

Off the pitch, controversy was caused when former chairman Freddy Shepherd, who had been forced to resign due to controversy over remarks made in the press the previous season, successfully manoeuvred to reinstate himself to the position within less than a year.

Transfers

In

 Total spending:  £28.55m

Out

 Total spending:  £2.6m

Players

First-team squad

Left club during season

Reserve squad

Trialists

Statistics

Appearances, goals and cards
(Starts + substitute appearances)

Starting 11
 GK: #1,  Shay Given, 41
 RB: #2,  Warren Barton, 24
 CB: #6,  Steve Howey, 18 (#38,  Andy Griffin, has 18 starts as a RB)
 CB: #34,  Nikos Dabizas, 35
 LB: #16,  Laurent Charvet, 38
 RM: #24,  Nolberto Solano, 33
 CM: #7,  Rob Lee, 24 (#17,  Stephen Glass, has 24 starts as a LM)
 CM: #12,  Dietmar Hamann, 30
 LM: #11,  Gary Speed, 43
 CF: #9,  Alan Shearer, 39
 CF: #14,  Temuri Ketsbaia, 22

Coaching staff

Results

Pre-season

Premier League

Results by matchday

UEFA Cup Winners' Cup

FA Cup

League Cup

References

External links
FootballSquads – Newcastle United – 1998/99
Newcastle United Football Club – Fixtures 1998–99
Season Details – 1998–99 – toon1892

1998-99
Newcastle United